Barão de Cocais is a Brazilian municipality located in the state of Minas Gerais. Its population  is estimated to be 32,866 people living in an altitude between 682 and 1425 meters. The city belongs to the mesoregion Metropolitana de Belo Horizonte and to the microregion of Itabira.

The municipality contains the Gongo Soco mine, once a gold mine and later a large iron ore operation, which closed in April 2016.

See also
 List of municipalities in Minas Gerais

References

Municipalities in Minas Gerais